Coleactina is a monotypic genus of flowering plants in the family Rubiaceae. The genus contains only one species, viz. Coleactina papalis, which is endemic to Congo and Gabon.

References

External links
Coleactina in the World Checklist of Rubiaceae

Monotypic Rubiaceae genera